Olivier Bausset (born 1 February 1982) is a French sailor and Olympic athlete who won a bronze medal at the 2008 Summer Olympics.

External links
 Bio on results.beijing2008.cn

Living people
1982 births
French male sailors (sport)
Olympic sailors of France
Sailors at the 2008 Summer Olympics – 470
Olympic bronze medalists for France
Olympic medalists in sailing
Medalists at the 2008 Summer Olympics
21st-century French people